"Oblivion" is a song by English rock band Terrorvision. Written by the band and produced by Gil Norton, the song was included as the second track on the band's second studio album, How to Make Friends and Influence People (1994). Like most Terrorvision songs, "Oblivion" contains political themes, but according to bass player Leigh Marklew, the messages were not taken seriously because of the song's doo-wop chorus. Released as the album's first single on  28 March 1994, the song peaked at number 21 on the UK Singles Chart and number 65 in Australia.

Release and reception
On 28 March 1994, "Oblivion" was issued as the lead single from How to Make Friends and Influence People. When the album was released on 18 April 1994, "Oblivion" appeared as the second track. According to AllMusic reviewer Leslie Mathew, the song is a satirical critique on "squatter hippies". Upon the single's release, Music & Media magazine likened the song to the Smithereens' "Top of the Pops" (1991) and called it "hard-to-forget" with "instant 'got-ya' quality". Danny Martin of WhatCulture praised the song's chorus, referring to it as "singalong perfection", as well as Tony Wright's vocals, calling them a "perfect vessel" for the track's offbeat lyrics.

On 3 April 1994, the single debuted at number 47 on the UK Singles Chart. The following week, it rose to its highest position of number 21, becoming Terrorvision's highest-charting single in the UK until February 1996, when "Perseverance" reached number five. "Oblivion" spent six weeks on the UK Singles Chart and is the band's second-longest-charting single in the UK, after 1999's "Tequila". Its British sales registered on the Eurochart Hot 100, peaking at number 72 on the issue dated 30 April 1994. In Australia, "Oblivion" is Terrorvision's only song to enter the top 100 of the ARIA Singles Chart, reaching number 65 in mid-1994.

Track listings

UK CD1
 "Oblivion"
 "The Model" (with Die Cheerleader)
 "Remember Zelda"

UK CD2 and Australian CD single
 "Oblivion"
 "Problem Solved" (by Die Cheerleader)
 "What Do You Do That For?"
 "Oblivion" (demo)

UK 7-inch single
A. "Oblivion"
B. "What Do You Do That For?"

UK 12-inch single
A1. "Oblivion"
A2. "The Model" (with Die Cheerleader)
B1. "Remember Zelda"
B2. "Problem Solved" (by Die Cheerleader)

French CD and 7-inch single
A. "Oblivion"
B. "The Model" (with Die Cheerleader)

Credits and personnel
Credits are adapted from the How to Make Friends and Influence People booklet and the UK CD1 liner notes.

Studio
 Mixed at The Church (London, England)

Personnel

 Terrorvision – writing, arrangement
 Tony Wright – vocals
 Shutty – drums
 Mark Yates – guitars
 Leigh Marklew – bass
 Anita Madigan – backing vocals
 Gil Norton – production, mixing
 Chris Sheldon – mixing

 Elliot Ness – mixing assistant
 John McDonnell – mixing assistant
 Al Clay – engineering
 Mike Cyr – engineering assistant
 Mark Phythian – programming
 Union Design – artwork design
 Toby McFarlan Pond – photography

Charts

References

1994 singles
1994 songs
EMI Records singles
Political songs
Song recordings produced by Gil Norton
Songs about hippies
Satirical songs
Terrorvision songs
Britpop songs